FDML may refer to:

 Flow Description Markup Language, a workflow language
 FileMaker Dynamic Markup Language
 Fourier Domain Mode Locking, a laser modelocking technique